Government College for Women, Thiruvananthapuram, also known as H.H. The Maharaja's College for Women, is one of the oldest women's college located in Trivandrum, Kerala. It was established in the year 1864 under the University of Madras.

Academic Programmes
The college offers undergraduates and postgraduate programmes in arts and science affiliated to the Kerala University. It has been accredited by NAAC with an A Grade. The college is ranked among the best colleges in India by National Institutional Ranking Framework.

Departments

Science

Physics
Chemistry
Mathematics
Botany
Zoology
Statistics
Home science

Arts and Commerce

English
History
Economics
Psychology
Music
Commerce
Philosophy

Accreditation
The college is recognized by the University Grants Commission (UGC).

Notable alumni
 Veena George, Minister for Health & Family Welfare, Government of Kerala
 Vinduja Menon, Malayalam film actress
Nabeesa Ummal, Indian politician and former MLA

References

External links
http://www.gcwtvm.ac.in

Educational institutions established in 1864
1864 establishments in India
Arts and Science colleges in Kerala
Colleges affiliated to the University of Kerala
Colleges in Thiruvananthapuram
Women's universities and colleges in Kerala
Academic institutions formerly affiliated with the University of Madras